Redhill and Northbourne is a ward in Bournemouth, Dorset. Since 2019, the ward has elected 2 councillors to Bournemouth, Christchurch and Poole Council.

History 
The ward formerly elected councillors to Bournemouth Borough Council before it was abolished in 2019.

Geography 
Redhill and Northbourne ward is the north of Bournemouth, covering the suburbs of Redhill, Northbourne and Hill View, the northern areas of Ensbury Park and the eastern areas of East Howe.

Councillors 
Two Independent councillors. On 3 October 2022, Jackie Edwards left the Conservatives to sit as an Independent.

Election results

2019

References 

Wards of Bournemouth, Christchurch and Poole